The Bayer designation Upsilon Eridani (υ Eri / υ Eridani) is shared by four stars, in the constellation Eridanus:
υ1 Eridani (50 Eridani)
υ2 Eridani (52 Eridani)
υ3 Eridani (43 Eridani)
υ4 Eridani (41 Eridani)

This series of stars bore the traditional proper names Theemim (also Theemin) and Beemin (also Beemim). In 2016, the International Astronomical Union organized a Working Group on Star Names (WGSN) to catalog and standardize proper names for stars. The WGSN approved the names Theemin for υ2 Eridani on 1 February 2017 and Beemim for υ3 Eridani on 30 June 2017; both are now so included in the List of IAU-approved Star Names.

References

Eridani, Upsilon
Eridanus (constellation)